Francesco Scianna (born 25 March 1982 in Palermo, Italy) is an Italian actor.

Biography

Early education and career
Francesco Scianna began his acting career in theater, debuting in 1997 with the recital of poems by Salvatore Quasimodo, "CEI". Later he participated in many other works and graduated from the National Academy of Dramatic Art Silvio D'Amico.

He debuted in the movie Il più bel giorno della mia vita (2002), directed by Cristina Comencini, followed by L'odore del sangue, (2004), directed by Mario Martone. In 2007, he acted in the movie L'uomo di vetro.

After these films he performed on television, in La luna e il lago and Il Capo dei Capi.

Major roles 
His big break came in 2009 when he played the role of Peppino Torrenuova, the male protagonist in Baarìa , directed by Giuseppe Tornatore, next to newcomer Margareth Madè. The film succeeded at the box office and was nominated by Italy as its entry in the Oscars 2010 and also nominated for a Golden Globe.

In 2010 Scianna acted in the movie Vallanzasca - Gli angeli del male, playing the role of Francis Turatello, with Kim Rossi Stuart, directed by Michele Placido. Also that year, he acted in Le cose che restano and in 2011 in Ti amo troppo per dirtelo.

Filmography

Films

Television

References

External links 

 

Living people
Italian male film actors
Male actors from Palermo
Accademia Nazionale di Arte Drammatica Silvio D'Amico alumni
1982 births